Pavan Wadeyar (born 10 December 1987) is an Indian film director, screenwriter, lyricist, actor and producer best known for his work in Kannada cinema. He is known for writing and directing Govindaya Namaha (2012), for which he won the SIIMA award for the Best Debut Director.

Career
Wadeyar began his career by working as an assistant director to Yogaraj Bhat in Pancharangi (2010). He made his directional debut with Govindaya Namaha (2012) that went to become a successful film. He won the SIIMA award for the Best Debut Director. He later remade the film in Telugu as Potugadu (2013).

Wadeyar's Googly starring Yash and Kriti Kharbanda was a major success. Wadeyar made his acting debut in 2014 film Preethi Geethi Ityaadi directed by Veerendra. In 2015 he directed Rana Vikrama starring Puneeth Rajkumar which became blockbuster hit. In 2016 Pavan directed Jessie and Nataraja Service.

His film Dollu won 68th National Film Awards 2022 in Best Feature Film in Kannada.

Personal life
Wadeyar was born on 10 December 1987 to Geetha and Gajanana Wadeyar in Kunigal, Karnataka. In recent Facebook live he told that he basically hails from Athani Taluk, Belagavi district. He has an elder sister called Ashwini Madhusudhan. He is a Bachelor of Commerce graduate with distinction. He worked at Fidelity company in Bangalore for 8 months due to his passion towards cinema he resigned his job and entered film industry. In December 2017, Wadeyar got engaged to actress and fashion designer Apeksha Purohit. They married in August 2018.

Filmography

Awards

References

External links
 

Living people
Kannada film directors
1987 births
Film directors from Bangalore
21st-century Indian film directors
Male actors in Kannada cinema
Screenwriters from Karnataka